Verbochny is a rural locality (a khutor) in Polevoye Rural Settlement, Novoanninsky District, Volgograd Oblast, Russia. The population was 53 as of 2010. There are 2 streets.

Geography 
Verbochny is located in forest steppe on the Khopyorsko-Buzulukskaya Plain, 41 km north of Novoanninsky (the district's administrative centre) by road. Zvyozdka is the nearest rural locality.

References 

Rural localities in Novoanninsky District